Batman has been featured in many ongoing series, annuals, miniseries, maxiseries, one-shots, graphic novels, trade paperbacks and intercompany crossovers published by DC Comics. These titles have been handled or coordinated through a single editorial section at DC Comics. This list also generally includes titles that have spun off of the core Batman titles to feature related characters and presents these and all other titles separated by general publication type.

Ongoing series

Annuals

Miniseries

One-shots and graphic novels

Intercompany crossover stories
{| class="wikitable sortable"
|-
! style="vertical-align:bottom; width:210px;"| Title
! style="vertical-align:bottom; width:85px;" class="unsortable"| Issues
! style="vertical-align:bottom; width:100px;"| Initial cover date
! style="vertical-align:bottom; width:100px;"| Final cover date
! style="vertical-align:bottom; |Co-publisher
! style="vertical-align:bottom;" class="unsortable"| Notes
|- style="vertical-align:top;"
| DC Special Series: Batman vs. the Incredible Hulk
| #27
| September 1981
|
|Marvel Comics
|The first Batman intercompany crossover story of them all.
|- style="vertical-align:top;"
| 
| 
| rowspan="2" | December 1991
| 
|Fleetway Publications
| 
|- style="vertical-align:top;"
| Batman versus Predator
| #1 – 3
| February 1992
|Dark Horse Comics
| Published in two formats.
|- style="vertical-align:top;"
| 
| #1
| rowspan="2" | August 1993
| 
| rowspan="2" | Comico Comics
| The first issue of a two-part story.
|- style="vertical-align:top;"
| 
| #2
| 
| The second issue of a two-part story.
|- style="vertical-align:top;"
| 
| 
| December 1993
| 
|Fleetway Publications
| 
|- style="vertical-align:top;"
| 
| #1 – 4
| December 1993
| March 1994
| Dark Horse Comics
| 
|- style="vertical-align:top;"
| 
| 
| rowspan="2" | spring 1994
| 
| rowspan="2" | Image Comics
| 
|- style="vertical-align:top;"
| 
| 
| 
| A sequel to this story, which was going to be titled Spawn/Batman: Inner Demons, was announced but never published.
|- style="vertical-align:top;"
| 
| 
| June 1994
| 
| rowspan="2" | Marvel Comics
| The semi-official beginning of the DC Comics crossover story line "KnightsEnd", which is the third and last part of the DC Comics crossover story arc Batman: Knightfall.
|- style="vertical-align:top;"
| 
| 
| October 1994
| 
| The semi-official ending of the DC Comics crossover story line "KnightsEnd", which is the third and last part of the DC Comics crossover story arc Batman: Knightfall.
|- style="vertical-align:top;"
| 
| 
| rowspan="2" | September 1995
| 
|Fleetway Publications 
| 
|- style="vertical-align:top;"
| 
| 
| 
| rowspan="4" | Marvel Comics
| A semi-official part of the intercompany crossover miniseries DC versus Marvel Comics/Marvel Comics vs. DC #1 – 4 (February – May 1996); it was briefly mentioned as having happened in issue #1.
|- style="vertical-align:top;"
| 
| 
| December 1996
| 
| Published under the Elseworlds logo. 
|- style="vertical-align:top;"
|  #1
| 
| rowspan="2" | April 1996
| 
| Published under the "Amalgam Comics" imprint.
|- style="vertical-align:top;"
| Legends of the Dark Claw #1
| 
| 
| Published under the "Amalgam Comics" imprint.
|- style="vertical-align:top;"
| 
| #1
| June 1996
| 
| rowspan="2" | Dark Horse Comics
| The first issue of a two-part story.
|- style="vertical-align:top;"
| 
| #2
| July 1996
| 
| The second issue of a two-part story.
|- style="vertical-align:top;"
| 
| 
| February 1997
| 
| Harris Comics
| 
|- style="vertical-align:top;"
| 
| #1 – 2
| March 1997
| April 1997
| Dark Horse Comics
| 
|- style="vertical-align:top;"
| Dark Claw Adventures #1
| 
| June 1997
| 
| rowspan="2" | Marvel Comics
| Published under the "Amalgam Comics" imprint.
|- style="vertical-align:top;"
|  | 
| October 1998
|  
| A semi-official part of the intercompany crossover miniseries Unlimited Access #1 – 4 (December 1997 – March 1998); it was briefly mentioned as having happened in issue #1.
|- 
| | #1 – 2
| rowspan="3" | January 1998
| 
|Fleetway Publications
| 
|- style="vertical-align:top;"
| | 
| 
| Event Comics
| 
|- style="vertical-align:top;"
| | 
| 
| Marvel Comics
| 
|-
|- style="vertical-align:top;"
| | #1 – 4
| November 1997
| February 1998
| rowspan="2" | Dark Horse Comics
| Published bi-weekly.
|- style="vertical-align:top;"
| | #1 – 2
| January 1999
| February 1999
| 
|- style="vertical-align:top;"
| | #1
| August 1999
| 
| Top Cow
| 
|- style="vertical-align:top;"
| | rowspan="3" | #1 – 4
| September 1999
| December 1999
| rowspan="3" | Dark Horse Comics
| 
|- style="vertical-align:top;"
| | May 2000
| August 2000
| 
|- style="vertical-align:top;"
| | August 2000
| December 2000
| 
|- style="vertical-align:top;"
| | 
| December 2000
| 
| Marvel Comics
| 
|-
| | #1 – 3
| March 2002
| August 2002
| WildStorm
| 
|- style="vertical-align:top;"
| | #1 – 3
| December 2002
| February 2003
| Dark Horse Comics
| 
|- style="vertical-align:top;"
| |
| February 2005
|
| WildStorm
| 
|- style="vertical-align:top;"
| |
| January 2007
|
|
| 
|-
|- style="vertical-align:top;"
| | #1 – 2
| March 2007
| April 2007
| Dark Horse Comics
| 
|-
| Batman '66 Meets the Green Hornet| rowspan="3" | #1 – 6
| August 2014
| January 2015
| Dynamite Entertainment
| 
|-
|Batman '66 Meets the Man from U.N.C.L.E.| February 2016
| July 2016
|
|
|- 
| Batman '66 Meets Steed and Mrs. Peel| September 2016
| February 2017
| Boom! Studios
|
|-
| Batman '66 Meets the Legion of Super Heroes| rowspan="1" | #1
| September 2017
|
|
|
|-
| Batman '66 Meets Wonder Woman '77| rowspan="9" | #1 – 6
| March 2017
| August 2017
|
|
|-
| Archie Meets Batman '66| July 2018
| December 2018
| Archie Comics
|
|- style="vertical-align:top;"
| | November 2015
| May 2016 
| rowspan="4" | IDW Publishing
|
|-
| | January 2016
| July 2017
|Originally was going to be titled Batman/TMNT Adventures.This is a separate story line from the series of three crossover stories also featuring these characters (see above and below) and is both based on, and connected to, Batman: The Animated Series.
|-
| Batman/Teenage Mutant Ninja Turtles II| February 2018
| June 2018
|
|-
| Batman/Teenage Mutant Ninja Turtles III| May 2019
| December 2019
|
|-
| Batman/The Shadow| April 2017
| September 2017
| rowspan="2" |Dynamite Entertainment
| A series of two previous crossover stories also featuring these two characters, but taking place in the Pre-Crisis universe of Earth-One, was chronicled in Batman #253 (November 1973) and 259 (November – December 1974).
|-
| The Shadow/Batman| October 2017
| March 2018
| 
|-
| Harley and Ivy Meet Betty and Veronica| December 2017
| May 2018
| Archie Comics
|
|- style="vertical-align:top;"
| Batman/The Maxx: Arkham Dreams| #1 – 5
| October 2018
| November 2020
| rowspan="2" | IDW Publishing
| Issues #1 and 2 were both cover dated October 2018, issue #3 was cover dated December 2018, issue #4 was cover dated October 2020 and issue #5 was cover dated November 2020.
|-
| Batman/The Maxx: Arkham Dreams - The Lost Years Compendium| #1
| September 2020
|  
| This issue was made to fill in the two-years-long gap between issues #3 and 4 of the above miniseries.
|- style="vertical-align:top;"
|Batman/Spawn|
|February 2023
|
|Image Comics
|This story is a separate one and is in no way connected to either of the preceding two Batman/Spawn stories cover dated spring 1994 (see above).
|}

Collected editions
Numerous Batman stories have been reprinted as collected editions. This section lists only reprints from ongoing series, miniseries, etc. All of these stories have been issued in trade paperback format unless noted otherwise.

DC Archive Editions
All DC Archive Editions were hardcover only and printed on high quality archival paper.

The Batman ChroniclesThe Batman Chronicles book series planned to reprint every Batman adventure in color, in chronological order, and in affordable trade paperbacks, but was cancelled before it could do so. It is not to be confused with the also now-cancelled comic book series of the same name.

Showcase Presents
All Showcase Presents collections were large (over 500 pages) softcover-only and black-and-white-only reprints.

Batman newspaper comic strip collections
The following collections reprinted the two Batman newspaper comic strips of 1943–1946 and 1966–1973.

Modern Batman
The following trade paperbacks are stories that run through the "contemporary" books of the Batman family. The earliest trade paperback, chronologically speaking, is Frank Miller's "Batman: Year One" story arc, which rebirthed the character in the Modern Age, retelling the first year of his existence, including who he was and how he came to be. These stories are from comic books that are still being published and are, in a sense, still ongoing. They are listed here in the chronology of the story lines, rather than the publication dates of either the original comics or collections.

The two trade paperback series Batman: The Caped Crusader and Batman: The Dark Knight Detective reprint most of the Post-Crisis issues of Batman and Detective Comics, respectively. However, both Caped Crusader and Dark Knight Detective feature eight major omissions: Dark Knight Detective omits Detective Comics #575–578 ("Batman: Year Two") and its sequel Batman: Full Circle and Caped Crusader omits the entire Max Alan Collins Batman run and the fill-in Batman issues that were published in between the Collins and Jim Starlin runs (the majority of which were previously reprinted in Batman: Second Chances, along with the Collins Penguin story in Batman Annual #11). Caped Crusader also omits several major Batman stories in its run, most notably Alan Moore's Clayface III story from Batman Annual #11, Batman: The Killing Joke and its sequel Batman #426–429 ("A Death in the Family"), and Batman #440–442/The New Titans #60–61 ("A Lonely Place of Dying"). Five of these eight omissions are also referred to in the two series' respective sections below.

The New 52 Batman
In 2011, DC Comics rebooted their entire continuity. This relaunched continuity, which ran from 2011 to 2016, is known as The New 52. The Batman family of books were also rebooted. While the history and elements of this new continuity are very similar to the previous one, there are still fundamental differences between them. As such, the following collected works should be treated as a separate canonical entity. The collected works are listed in order of publication date, not in chronological order. This list includes all New 52 titles centered around Batman.

The New 52 Batman new editions

This list is for updated versions of the various New 52 titles. The titles presented here may be updated to a more concise trade or expand on previous trades.

DC Rebirth Batman
In 2016, DC Comics once again relaunched its continuity and entire line of ongoing monthly superhero comic books. Using the end of The New 52 initiative in May 2016 as its launching point, DC Rebirth intended to restore the DC Universe to a form much like that prior to the Flashpoint story arc, while still incorporating numerous elements of The New 52, including its continuity. The collected works are listed in order of publication date, not in chronological order. This list includes all DC Rebirth titles centered around Batman. The DC Comics crossover story lines Dark Nights: Metal and Dark Nights: Death Metal are both included here strictly due to their Batman-centric focus.

DC Rebirth Batman new editions

This list is for updated versions of the various DC Rebirth titles. The titles presented here may be updated to a more concise trade or expand on previous trades.

Batman: Legends of the Dark Knight
The following are collected works of the comic book series Batman: Legends of the Dark Knight, which primarily concentrates on early tales in Batman's career that are not necessarily considered canon, but have also been used during major crossover story lines (such as Batman: Knightfall and Batman: No Man's Land''). The series has not yet been completely collected in book form as of this date.

Batman Confidential
This series has been collected in the following trade paperbacks.

Superman/Batman
This series has been collected in the following trade paperbacks.

Batman: Shadow of the Bat
This series has been collected in the following trade paperbacks.

Batman: Gotham Knights
This series has been collected in the following trade paperbacks.

Batman: Arkham and Gotham City Impostors tie-in story collections

Batman '66 collections

Intercompany crossover story collections
This list includes crossover comic book stories between Batman and other characters from different companies.

Miscellaneous collections
These volumes are collections of stories from various Batman continuities, with loose connections of superhero, supervillain, location or subject.

Writer/artist collections

DC Omnibuses / Absolute editions / Batman Noir editions / Batman Unwrapped editions / DC Deluxe Editions

Anthology editions
The decade editions (see below) reprint the "best" stories of each decade of the 20th century almost from the beginning of the characters' history onward (except for the 1930s and the 1990s, which were not included for unknown reasons) in trade paperbacks.

Batman Beyond collections

Batman animated TV series collections

See also
 List of Spider-Man titles
 List of Superman comics
 Publication history of Anarky
 Publication history of Dick Grayson
 Publication history of Superman
 Publication history of Wonder Woman

References

External links
 
 Comics Research Bibliography: Batman  An international bibliography of comic books, comic strips, animation, caricatures, cartoons, bandes dessinees and related topics
 Batman-On-Film.com's Batman comics subsite
 Comics at BatmanYTB
 The Trade Paperback List: Batman
 TheBatSquad.net
 DC Comics: List of Batman Graphic Novels
 Bat-Encyclopedia 
 Batman Trades Chronological list of Batman trade paperbacks and hardcover graphic novels in reading order
 Cracked.com's 20 Most Ridiculous Batman Comics

 
Comics
Batman
Batman
Batman